Indira Gandhi Zoological Park is located amidst Kambalakonda Reserve Forest in Visakhapatnam, Andhra Pradesh, India. It is the third largest zoo in the country.

The zoological park is named after the former Prime Minister of India, Indira Gandhi. It was declared open to the public on 19 May 1977. It is situated in Visakhapatnam amidst the scenic Eastern Ghats of India. It is surrounded by the Eastern Ghats on three sides and Bay of Bengal on the fourth side. Nearly eighty species of animals numbering to about eight hundred are present in the zoo.

In collaboration with Stardust Ventures, Vizag zoo launched a web portal for animal adoption, to engage the community with latest events. It also allows general public to adopt an animal for certain time period. IGZP conducts various events regularly, like E-Webinars and Quizzes and also provides E-Certificates for the participants. The webinars are interactive sessions organized with various experts, and are streamed live over YouTube.

It has entrance and exit gates situated oppositely, with one towards National Highway 5 and the other towards Beach Road at Sagar Nagar. It is open to public daily except Monday.

In February 2022, the zoo was received accreditation from the World Association or Zoos and Aquariums (WAZA) for coordinating a successful dhole breeding programme.

Exhibits
In an area of  the zoo located among the Kambalakonda Wildlife Sanctuary of the Eastern Ghats, the zoo has enclosures for many different types of animals, a jungle along a water body inside the zoo park. The zoo has several native mammals such as Indian elephants, greater one-horned rhinos, Bengal tigers, Asiatic lions, Indian leopards, striped hyenas, dholes, sloth bears, gaur, sambar deer and rhesus macaques, as well as exotic mammals like hippos, giraffes, Grant's zebras and chimpanzees. It also has a variety of birds including ostriches, rosy pelicans, grey herons, Indian peafowl and black swans. All three native species of crocodilian, the mugger crocodile, gharial and saltwater crocodile are housed in the zoo, along with several other species of reptiles.

Gallery

References

External links

Official website of: "Central Zoo Authority of India" (CZA), Government of India
 Vizag Zoo

Zoos in Andhra Pradesh
Parks in Visakhapatnam
Tourist attractions in Visakhapatnam
1977 establishments in Andhra Pradesh
Monuments and memorials to Indira Gandhi
Zoos established in 1977
Education in Visakhapatnam
Buildings and structures in Visakhapatnam
Uttarandhra